Sheila Rena Ingram (March 23, 1957 – September 1, 2020) was an American athlete who competed mainly in the 400 metres.

Born in Washington, D.C., she competed for United States in the 1976 Summer Olympics held in Montreal, Quebec, Canada in the 4 x 400 metres where she won the silver medal with her teammates Debra Sapenter, Pamela Jiles and Rosalyn Bryant. She was the 1976 National Champion, behind Lorna Forde a guest participant from Barbados.

References 

 
 
 

1957 births
2020 deaths
Track and field athletes from Washington, D.C.
American female sprinters
Athletes (track and field) at the 1976 Summer Olympics
Olympic silver medalists for the United States in track and field
Medalists at the 1976 Summer Olympics
Olympic female sprinters
21st-century American women
20th-century American women